The BumZen Collective, also called BumZen, is a collective and underground scene for various left-wing radical groups in Nørrebro in Copenhagen.

History
On 25 January 1986, two contiguous houses in Baldersgade 20-22 in Nørrebro were occupied, where the BumZen Collective was established. A foundation bought the house from Arne Barnesen for about a million kroner. The money came from donations via The Sky Blue Foundation, led by Kim Larsen, who has a past as a squatter, who had his way in the squatted house Sofiegården and had a rehearsal room where the rock band Gasolin was formed in the late 1960s, donated DKK 500,000 and Lise Plum, who was married to Niels Munk Plum, a former resistance fighter who was himself active on the left wing and a member of the Left Socialists, donated DKK 400,000 to the foundation, the rest was paid for by the young people themselves.

The house was searched by the police, who used tear gas in connection with the riots in March 2007 in continuation of the clearing of the Ungdomshuset on Jagtvej 69.

References 

1986 establishments in Denmark
Anarchism in Denmark
History of Copenhagen
Nørrebro
Youth culture
Squatting in Denmark